Mohamad bin Haji Alamin (Jawi: داتوق محمد بن حج الأمين) is a Malaysian politician who has served as the Deputy Minister of Foreign Affairs in the Pakatan Harapan (PH) administration under Prime Minister Anwar Ibrahim and Minister Zambry Abdul Kadir since December 2022 and the Member of Parliament (MP) for Kimanis since January 2020. He served as the Deputy Minister of Education II in the Barisan Nasional (BN) administration under former Prime Minister Ismail Sabri Yaakob and former Minister Radzi Jidin from September 2021 to the collapse of the BN administration in November 2022 and Chairman of the Intellectual Property Corporation of Malaysia (MyIPO) from May 2020 to March 2022. He is a member of the United Malays National Organisation (UMNO), a component party of the BN coalition.

Personal life 
Mohamad was born in Kg. Kelatuan, Batu Enam Kimanis, Papar, Sabah. His father, Haji Alamin is an ethnic Kadazan from Kg. Kelatuan, Kimanis, Papar whilst his mother is an ethnic Brunei Malay from Kg. Brunei, Membakut, Beaufort.

Education 

He received his primary education at Kelatuan Primary School in Kimanis, Papar. He then continued his studies at Toh Puan Hajjah Rahmah Religious Secondary School in Kinarut, Papar. 

After graduating from secondary school, he obtained a Law Degree from the International Islamic University of Malaysia.

Career 

In 1997, he was accepted as an advocate & solicitor of the Sabah & Sarawak High Court.

Political career

Mohamad has held various of positions throughout his political career such as President of Sabahan Affairs Council, Youth Chief of UMNO Kimanis (2004–2013), and Vice Leader of UMNO Kimanis (2013–2018). He is currently the division leader of UMNO Kimanis.

In 2013 general election, Mohamad contested for Bongawan state assembly seat for the first time. He won the seat by majority of 3,392 votes.

He contested again in 2018 general election to retain the same seat. However, he was defeated by WARISAN candidate, Daud Yusof who is appointed as State Minister of Education.

2020 Kimanis by-election

In January 2020, Mohamad first contested to become an MP in Kimanis by-election. The election was held after the seat was declared vacant after the Federal Court on 2 December 2019 upheld the Election Court's ruling earlier on 16 August, nullifying the sitting Member of Parliament (MP), Anifah Aman's victory in the 2018 general election (GE14). BN decided to field Mohamad Alamin as their candidate for the by-election.

He won the by-election after defeating Karim Bujang from Sabah Heritage Party (WARISAN), by majority 2,029 votes.

Election results

Honours 
  :
  Commander of the Order of Kinabalu (PGDK) – Datuk  (2015)

References 

1972 births
Living people
Kadazan-Dusun people
People from Sabah
Malaysian people of Malay descent
Malaysian Muslims
United Malays National Organisation politicians
Members of the Dewan Rakyat
Malaysian people of Bruneian descent
21st-century Malaysian politicians
Commanders of the Order of Kinabalu